The Tully Center for Free Speech is a research institution dedicated to the study, protection, and promotion of free speech in the S. I. Newhouse School of Public Communications at Syracuse University in Syracuse, New York. It also brings in speakers throughout the year who lecture in classes and at events at the Newhouse School and across the Syracuse University community. The center was founded in 2006 with a bequest from Joan A. Tully, an alumna of the Newhouse School & Daily Orange.

History

Founding

The Tully Center for Free Speech was founded in 2006 in the wake of the deteriorating state of free speech and the public’s lack of access to information during wartime. Speaking at an inaugural event for the center, Floyd Abrams, a noted First Amendment attorney, highlighted the Bush administration's criticisms, ridicules, and threats against those who try to disseminate information and said that "almost everything in government is kept secret beyond any laws of reason."

The center was named after Joan A. Tully in recognition of her contributions. Tully wrote for the independent student newspaper The Daily Orange and graduated from Syracuse University with a degree in journalism and english in 1969. She worked for the AP Dow Jones Newswires in New York City, The Brussels Times in Brussels, Belgium, and later edited weekly newspapers in New Jersey. She graduated from Fordham University School of Law in 1983 and worked on First Amendment and land preservation issues before starting an antique textile business.

Events
In March 2012, the Tully Center for Free Speech’s Distinguished Speaker Series hosted free speech advocate Mary Beth Tinker. Tinker shared her experience of protesting the Vietnam War by wearing a black armband to school, being suspended for violating an unjust policy, and suing the school district with the help of the ACLU that led to a landmark decision by the U.S. Supreme Court that upheld students’ rights to free speech.

In March 2013, Larry Flynt presented a talk as the Tully Center's Distinguished Speaker to celebrate 25 years since the precedent-setting Hustler v. Falwell Supreme Court case. Other past speakers have included Daniel Ellsberg, New York Times reporter Brian Stelter, Amy Goodman of Democracy Now!, Floyd Abrams,  Irving Feiner, and Alan Alda.

In April 2015, the Tully Center hosted a panel on whistleblowing and journalism. The speakers, including Kristina Borjesson, Louis Clark, and Thomas Tamm discussed the important role whistleblowers and the press play in promoting accountability and the challenges they face. Mary Beth Tinker returned to the Tully Center in October 2015 during Banned Book Week to discuss free speech rights and celebrate the First Amendment. In November, 2015, the Tully Center hosted Tech executive and owner of Aereo, Chet Kanojia, to discuss the shutdown of Aereo after the company was sued for copyright violations.

In conjunction with the Society of Professional Journalists and the Institute for Security Policy and Law at Syracuse University, the Tully Center hosted John F. Sopko who was appointed to be the Special Inspector General for Afghanistan Reconstruction in October 2016. Toward the end of 2016, The Tully Center hosted Free Speech Week, a week dedicated to advocating for the First Amendment.

In February 2017, the Tully Center held a screening of Tickling Giants, a documentary which followed how Dr. Bassem Youssef finds creative, non-violent ways to protect free speech and fight a president who abuses his power. From February to April 2017, The Tully Center hosted the speaker series, Law Politics and the Media. The speakers featured in this series include: Dahlia Lithwick, a Supreme Court Reporter; Tom Bruce, a pioneer for the Free Access to Law movement; Jennifer Borg, First Amendment lawyer; Jenny Diamond Cheng, lawyer and Vanderbilt researcher; and Matthew Levendusky, author and political scientist. Then, in April 2017, Dr. Changfeng Chen gave a lecture discussing internet governance in China. In October 2017, The Tully Center hosted Nadine Strossen, the former president of the American Civil Liberties Union for a discussion of Free Speech on College campuses. In October, the Tully Center launched a video series, which examined the major developments in First Amendment Law.

In April 2018, The Tully Center hosted Brett Orzechowski, author of FOIL: The Law and the Future of Public Information in New York, to discuss how the Freedom of Information Law remains a critical part of investigative reporting. Then, Lee Rainie, director of internet and technology research at the Pew Research Center, came to speak about factual reporting of public opinion polls in tense times. Later that year, The Tully Center brought in Rodney Sieh, a journalist who faced a 5,000 year jail sentence in Liberia for working as an independent journalist, to speak about his experiences and book Journalist on Trial.

The Tully Center kicked off their 2019 events calendar by hosting Nina Totenberg, renowned NPR correspondent, for a lecture on her experiences covering legal affairs. In April, The Tully Center presented Maria Ressa, a journalist and editor of online news platform Rappler, with the 2018 Tully Award for Free Speech for her coverage of Filipino President Rodrigo Duterte. In mid-September, The Tully Center hosted cartoonist Dwayne "Mr. Fish" Booth for a screening of documentary Mr.Fish: Cartooning from the Deep End.

The Tully Award
The Tully Award is presented annually to a journalist who has shown courage in facing a free speech threat. Candidates are nominated by an international panel of journalists and lawyers, while the winner is selected by an Award Committee of SU faculty and students.

References

External links

Freedom of speech in the United States
2006 establishments in New York (state)
Educational institutions established in 2006
Free expression awards
Syracuse University research institutes